Jhajjar railway station is a railway station in Jhajjar, Haryana. Its code is JHJ. The station consists of three platforms. There are many trains available for Delhi as well as for long-distance journeys. The station lies on Rewari–Rohtak line

It serves Jhajjar city as its main station. The platform is not well sheltered. It lacks many facilities including water and sanitation. Station is situated on Pilani–Charkhi Dadri Road. Eight trains halt at the station including one first CNG train of India.

Major trains 
 Rohtak–Rewari DEMU
 Rewari–Rohtak (via Jhajjar) Passenger
 Chandigarh Daulatpur Chowk–Jaipur Intercity Express
 Rewari–Rohtak- Jind DEMU

References

Railway stations in Jhajjar district
Delhi railway division
Jhajjar